A King George's Field is a public open space in the United Kingdom dedicated to the memory of King George V (3 June 1865 – 20 January 1936).

References

Somerset
King G
King G
Lists of buildings and structures in Somerset